MacKenna is usually a surname, and may refer to

 Sir James MacKenna (1872–1940), British-Indian civil servant
 John MacKenna (born 1952), Irish playwright and novelist
 Juan Mackenna (1771–1814), military officer
 Stephen MacKenna (1872–1934), Irish linguist, journalist, translator and author
 Benjamín Vicuña Mackenna (1831–1886), Chilean politician and writer, grandson of the above Juan

See also
Mackenna's Gold, 1969 western film
McKenna (disambiguation)
Kenna (disambiguation)
Makena (disambiguation)

Surnames